Vadhandhi: The Fable of Velonie is an 2022 Indian-Tamil-language mystery crime thriller streaming television series created by Andrew Louis, of Leelai and Kolaigaran fame, for Amazon Prime Video. It was directed and written by Andrew Louis, with production designed by Arun Venjaramoodu. The principal cast of the series includes S. J. Suryah, Laila, Nassar, Sanjana Krishnamoorthy, Smruthi Venkat, Vivek Prasanna, Kumaran Thangarajan, Vaibhav Murugesan, Vikky Aadithya and Hareesh Peradi. It premiered on December 2, 2022 and consists of eight episodes.

Synopsis
The story revolved around the murder of a young girl, seen from the Rashomon-esque perspectives of an unrelenting obsessed cop as Vivek (S. J. Suryah), a novelist captivated by her grace and an opportunistic news editor.

This show shows various dynamics and sociological aspects of our society with chilling thrill.

Cast

Main

Supporting

Episodes

Development

Production
The series is Pushkar–Gayathri`s second collaboration with Amazon Prime Video. Earlier, the filmmaker duo had created the investigative thriller, Suzhal: The Vortex, for the streaming giant. The series is directed by Andrew Louis.

Casting
Tamil film director and actor, S. J. Suryah as a police officer. he is making their debut with the series. Sanjana was cast as Velonie, actress Laila was cast as Ruby, she making their debut with the series. Besides Nassar, Sanjana, Smruthi Venkat, Vivek Prasanna, Kumaran Thangarajan, Vaibhav Murugesan, Vikky Aadithya and Hareesh Peradi were cast then.

Release
It was announced on Thursday 17 November that the series will be released in Tamil and dubbed in Telugu, Hindi, Malayalam and Kannada and will make its streaming debut on December 2, on Amazon Prime Video. And also was Release the first look poster, The poster features a visibly shocked S. J. Suryah looking at a person lying dead in a field. 
The series was highly inspired by the American TV Series The Killing. The Murder mystery of Rosie Larson.

References

External links 
 

Tamil-language web series
2022 Tamil-language television series debuts
Amazon Prime Video original programming
Tamil-language thriller television series
Tamil-language crime television series